South Wind is a Serbian crime drama television series from 2020. It stars Miloš Biković, Miodrag Radonjić, Miki Manojlović and Miloš Timotijević in main roles.

The eponymous film from 2018 makes for the first four episodes of the series′ first season. Remaining ten episodes were originally made for television. The South Wind.

Plot
A young member of Belgrade mafia gang puts his and lives of his family members when he angers a mafia boss.

Cast

Production

Reception

External links 
 

2010s crime television series
Serbian crime television series
2020 Serbian television series debuts
Fiction set in 2019
Television shows set in Belgrade
Works about the Serbian Mafia
Television shows filmed in Belgrade
Works about organized crime in Serbia
Radio Television of Serbia original programming